The African Artists' Foundation (AAF) is a non-profit organization, based in Lagos, Nigeria. It was founded in 2007 by Azu Nwagbogu to promote Nigerian and other African art and artists.

Projects
The AAF started the following projects:
 Lagos Photo Festival – began in 2010 as the first international arts festival of photography in Nigeria.
 NAC – National Art Competition – an annual arts competition that began in 2008.
 Female Artist's Platform
 CDI – Capacity Development Integration
 YECA – Youth Empowerment through Contemporary Art
 ABA – Art Base Africa, it is an online platform for debating about African contemporary art''

See also
WIMBIZ

References

External links

African artist groups and collectives
Non-profit organizations based in Nigeria
Non-profit organizations based in Lagos
Arts in Lagos
Arts organizations based in Nigeria